Elvis Alejandro Araújo (born July 15, 1991) is a Venezuelan professional baseball pitcher who is a free agent. He previously played in Major League Baseball (MLB) for the Philadelphia Phillies and in Nippon Professional Baseball for the Chunichi Dragons.

Career

Cleveland Indians
Araújo signed as an international free agent with the Cleveland Indians in 2007.  Araujo made his professional debut in 2008 for the DSL Indians. Araujo did not appear in a professional game until 2011 when he appeared for the AZL Indians. He spent the 2012 season in Single-A with the Lake County Captains, pitching to a 7–10 record and 5.00 ERA in 28 innings. Araujo only appeared in 2 game in 2013, both with the High-A Carolina Mudcats, and allowed 8 runs in 9 innings. He split 2014 with the Double-A Akron RubberDucks and Carolina, accumulating a 2–1 record and 3.42 ERA in 43 games.

Philadelphia Phillies
The Phillies signed Araujo to a major league contract on November 13, 2014.

Araújo was promoted to the major leagues on May 2, 2015, making his debut on May 5. He earned his first career victory on May 15. While pitching only  of an inning, striking out the Arizona Diamondbacks' David Peralta to shut down the 7th inning for the Phillies defense, he was the pitcher of record when the Phillies regained the lead in the next half-inning. Araujo suffered a strained left groin late in the 2015 season and was placed on the 60-day disabled list. He had recorded a 3.38 ERA in 40 appearances up to that point. In 2016 for Philadelphia, Araujo made 32 appearances, but struggled to a 5.60 ERA in 27 innings.

Miami Marlins
On November 18, 2016, Araújo was claimed off waivers by the Miami Marlins. He was designated for assignment on December 23. and subsequently was released on January 5, 2017.

Chunichi Dragons
Following his release from the Marlins organization, Araújo signed with the Chunichi Dragons in Japan's Nippon Professional Baseball. Araujo made 6 appearances for Chunichi in 2017, recording a 6.48 ERA with 6 strikeouts.

Baltimore Orioles
On February 6, 2018, Araújo signed a minor league contract with the Baltimore Orioles organization. Araujo struggled to a 5.85 ERA with the High-A Frederick Keys before being released on July 26, 2018.

Miami Marlins (second stint)
On February 18, 2019, Araújo signed a minor league contract with the Miami Marlins. He was released on June 20, 2019, after stumbling to a 7.64 ERA with the Double-A Jacksonville Jumbo Shrimp.

Mexican League
On May 29, 2021, Araújo signed with the Sultanes de Monterrey of the Mexican League. He was released on March 17, 2022. On May 11, 2022, he signed with the Mariachis de Guadalajara. In 8 starts, Araújo posted a 1–2 record with a 6.90 ERA. He was waived on June 21, 2022. On June 24, he was claimed off waivers by the Sultanes de Monterrey. In 3 starts, Araújo registered a 1–0 record with a 4.22 ERA. He was waived on July 14, 2022, and claimed the same day by the Bravos de León. Araújo was later released on December 6, 2022.

See also
 List of Major League Baseball players from Venezuela

References

External links

Elvis Araújo at Pura Pelota (Venezuelan Professional Baseball League)

1991 births
Living people
Águilas del Zulia players
Akron RubberDucks players
Arizona League Indians players
Carolina Mudcats players
Chunichi Dragons players
Dominican Summer League Indians players
Venezuelan expatriate baseball players in the Dominican Republic
Lake County Captains players
Mahoning Valley Scrappers players
Major League Baseball pitchers
Major League Baseball players from Venezuela
Mariachis de Guadalajara players
Nippon Professional Baseball pitchers
Philadelphia Phillies players
Reading Fightin Phils players
Sportspeople from Maracaibo
Sultanes de Monterrey players
Venezuelan expatriate baseball players in Japan
Venezuelan expatriate baseball players in Mexico
Venezuelan expatriate baseball players in the United States
Venezuelan expatriate baseball players in Colombia